Luca Tremolada (born 25 November 1991) is an Italian footballer who plays as a midfielder for  club Modena.

Club career

Inter (youth)
Born in Milan, Lombardy, Tremolada started his career at Inter. He also played a few friendlies for the first team. He won 2009–10 UEFA Champions League as unused member, which the team named him as one of the U21 youth product in the list B since 2008–09 edition.

He was the team joint-topscorer in Allievi Nazionali under-17 team in 2007–08 season (along with Sulaiman Sesay Fullah), it was due to Mattia Destro promoted to Primavera under-20 team and played less regularly in Allievi Nazionali.

Piacenza
In summer 2010, he left for Serie B club Piacenza in co-ownership deal for €750,000 along with defender Andrea Mei (50% registration rights valued €750,000) keeper Luca Stocchi, while Inter signed Andrea Lussardi (50% valued €900,000) and Matteo Colombi (50% valued €600,000). Additionally, Piacenza loaned Nicola Milani and Fabio Hoxha from Inter's youth teams. Tremolada immediately entered Piacenza's first team, started the first match of the team, winning
Lanciano 5–3 in 2010–11 Coppa Italia. He also started the next 2 matches in Serie B, as a winger in 4231 formation. He then lost his starting place to Alessandro Marchi and received his last first team call-up on 17 September. The coach changed the tactic to 433 and preferred Marchi as right midfielder. He played his fourth Serie B in November and only played four more times in the second half of 2010–11 season.

On 24 June 2011 he returned to Inter along with Mei and Piacenza bought back Lussardi and Colombi.

Return to Inter
Tremolada became an Inter player again in June 2011. He left for A.C. Pisa 1909 in temporary deal in 2011–12 season. In May 2012, Tremolada was included in the 20-men squad of Inter for Indonesia friendly tour. He scored the third goal against Indonesia League Selection as a substitute of Samuele Longo.

Como
On 18 July 2012 Tremolada was signed by Calcio Como in a new co-ownership deal for a peppercorn fee. Internazionale made a write-down on Tremolada's accounting value for €1.162 million.

Varese
On 5 July 2013 he was signed by Varese. On 1 September 2014 he left for Reggiana on a temporary deal.

Arezzo
On 29 July 2015 he was signed by Arezzo.

Entella
In July 2016 Tremolada was signed by Entella.

Ternana (loan)
On 25 August 2017 Tremolada joined Ternana on a temporary deal, with an option to purchase.

Brescia
In July 2018, Tremolada joined Brescia, initially on loan.

Pordenone
On 31 January 2020, he moved to Serie B club Pordenone and signed a 2.5-year contract.

Loan to Cosenza 
On 13 January 2021, he was loaned to Cosenza.

Modena
On 31 August 2021, he signed a two-year contract with Modena.

International career
Tremolada was a regular member of Azzurrini U19 team, played almost all matches from 2008 to 2010. The U19 (born 1991) team's season was started early due to the exit of the previous age group (born 1990 U19 team) in October 2008. Tremolada made his U19 team debut along with Inter teammate Mattia Destro and Luca Caldirola (who were the U19 regular too), winning Romania 3–1 in December 2008. He then played a successive appearances for U19 team (born 1991 class), against Norway (March), Ukraine (born 1990 class, April) and Denmark (September). Missed a friendly in October, he played all 3 matches in qualifying and the next 3 friendlies. In the elite round, he also played all 3 matches, but only one as starter. That match he scored a goal against Northern Ireland.

Tremolada also played for 2008–09 season's U18 team (born 1991 class), which de facto the same team with U19 team, but opponent's age were different. He scored a goal in his U18 debut, against Denmark U18 in January 2009. He also played at a U18 tournament in Slovakia in April 2009, scored 2 goals.

Tremolada played twice in 2010 UEFA European Under-19 Football Championship, which Italy finished as the last of Group B (equal 7th) without any win and any goal.

Career statistics

Club

Honours
Internazionale Youth
Campionato Nazionale Allievi: 2008
Campionato Giovanissimi Nazionali: 2006

References

External links
 Lega Serie B Profile 
 FIGC 

1991 births
Living people
Footballers from Milan
Italian footballers
Association football wingers
Serie A players
Serie B players
Serie C players
Inter Milan players
Piacenza Calcio 1919 players
Pisa S.C. players
Como 1907 players
S.S.D. Varese Calcio players
A.C. Reggiana 1919 players
S.S. Arezzo players
Virtus Entella players
Ternana Calcio players
Brescia Calcio players
Pordenone Calcio players
Cosenza Calcio players
Modena F.C. 2018 players
Italy youth international footballers